Matt Groat is an Australian rugby league footballer who plays for the Easts Tigers in the Intrust Super Cup. He has previously played for Thirlmere Roosters in the Group 6 Rugby League, St. George Illawarra Dragons, Wests Tigers in the NRL and Doncaster, and the Dewsbury Rams in the Championship.

Playing career

Early years
From the small town of Rankins Springs in the Riverina, Groat lived on a 6000ha property. He went to school in Griffith, before becoming a student at renowned rugby league school St Gregory's College, Campbelltown. During his time at the school he was named as the most valuable player for his team at the 2010 Australian Schoolboys Championships, and represented the Australian Schoolboys team in 2009 and 2010. In 2011, he was named in the Junior Kangaroos team.

Wests Tigers
Groat joined the Wests Tigers NYC Cup team in 2011. By round 12 he had progressed to making his début in first grade, after a late injury to Wade McKinnon. Having already played a lower-grade game, Groat came off the bench in the last 5 minutes. Later in the season, Groat became a regular in the first side, playing off the bench. Wests Tigers won 8 of the 10 games he played in 2011.

In an early-season match in 2012, Groat was knocked unconscious by a shoulder charge from Brisbane Broncos forward Ben Te'o. The incident was considered a "test case" on how the NRL Judiciary would treat players who made contact with the head when attempting a shoulder-charge. Two weeks later Groat played for New South Wales in the inaugural under-20s State of Origin match, but he failed to make a further first grade appearance for the season.

Groat was unable to play at the start of 2013 due to injury. Coach Mick Potter said, "Matt got his ankle, foot and toe caught in the ground and got some weight on the back of it. He had been working hard and his shape was looking better too." He didn't play any first grade in 2013.

St. George Illawarra Dragons
In September 2013, it was announced that Groat had signed with the Dragons for at least one season. He failed to make any first-grade appearances for the club, and a year later signed with Salford.

Doncaster
On 16 April 2015, Groat signed for English side Doncaster.

Dewsbury
On 29 January 2016, Groat was released by Doncaster and signed with Dewsbury.

Central Queensland
In 2017, Groat returned to Australia and signed with Queensland Cup side the Central Queensland Capras.  On 16 January 2018, Groat was released by Central Queensland and signed with the Easts Tigers.

Easts Tigers
Groat made a total of 8 appearances for Easts in his first season at the club scoring no tries.

Personal life
Groat has studied a Certificate 4 in Fitness.

Footnotes

1992 births
Living people
Australian rugby league players
Balmain Ryde-Eastwood Tigers players
Central Queensland Capras players
Dewsbury Rams players
Doncaster R.L.F.C. players
Illawarra Cutters players
Junior Kangaroos players
Rugby league players from Sydney
Rugby league props
Wests Tigers NSW Cup players
Wests Tigers players